Nacala-a-Velha, is a town on the northern coast of Mozambique. It is located on the western shore of inner Fernao Veloso Bay, opposite the city of Nacala.

Nacala-a-Velha is the site of a large marine coal terminal which opened in January 2016. The terminal is operated by the Port of Nacala, but physically separate from the commercial port across the bay. The Nacala railway links the coal terminal to the coalfields at Moatize in Tete Province. Coal is loaded from trains onto ships at Nacala-a-Velha for export to other countries.

See also 
 Fernao Veloso Bay
 Transport in Mozambique
 Railway stations in Mozambique
 Nacala Logistics Corridor

References

External links 
 Nacala development corridor
  Accommodation and Scuba Diving on the east side of the bay

Populated places in Nampula Province